The northern riffleshell (Epioblasma torulosa rangiana), is a subspecies of freshwater mussel, an aquatic bivalve mollusk in the family Unionidae, the river mussels.

This subspecies is endangered.

This species was formerly found widely in the Ohio River basin, but now the population is fragmented into only three viable groups.

This river mussel needs gravel river beds and swift-flowing, well-oxygenated water. The reduction in range seems to be principally due to damming and the consequential silting up of rivers below the dam and competition from zebra mussels.

Distribution and conservation status 

This species lives in Ontario in Canada. It was classified as endangered by COSEWIC. The Canadian Species at Risk Act listed it in the List of Wildlife Species at Risk as being endangered in Canada.

References 

Epioblasma
ESA endangered species
Taxa named by Isaac Lea